Masjedlu may refer to:
 Masjedlu, Ardabil
 Masjedlu, Bileh Savar, Ardabil Province
 Masjedlu, Germi, Ardabil Province
 Masjedlu, East Azerbaijan